Acalolepta fuscopunctata is a species of beetle in the family Cerambycidae. It was described by Per Olof Christopher Aurivillius in 1927. It is known from Philippines.

References

Acalolepta
Beetles described in 1927